Ian Beesley (born 1954) is a British social documentary photographer who has focused on Northern England, particularly Bradford, since the late 1970s. He is course leader for the MA in photography at the University of Bolton. Beesley's work is held in the collections of the Science Museum Group and Smithsonian Institution. In 2012, he was awarded an Honorary Fellowship of the Royal Photographic Society.

Life and work
Beesley was born in Eccleshill, Bradford. He studied at Bradford Art College and Bournemouth & Poole College of Art.

Since the late 1970s, he has documented the changing social landscape of Northern England, particularly in Bradford. He photographed Salts Mill in Saltaire as it was closing down in 1986. He spent five years working on the series The Art of Clubbing, about nightclub culture in the UK.

Beesley had a long career working for the Telegraph & Argus daily newspaper in Bradford. He is course leader for the MA in photography at the University of Bolton in Greater Manchester.

Publications
Where Sky & Water Meet. Arts Council, 1982.
Through the Mill. NMPFTV, 1987.
Victorian Bradford. Ryburn, 1987.
Now I can tell. McMillan, 1990.
Warwickshire Hatters. Ryburn, 1988.
Calderdale. Ryburn, 1988.
Victorian Manchester & Salford. Ryburn, 1988.
Leeds Architectural Heritage. Ryburn, 1993.
A Place of Work. The Keeled University press, 1995.
Claret & Amber. Darkroom/NMPFTV, 2000.
Building Sights. Leeds City Council, 2001.
The Power, the Pride, the Passion. Darkroom, 2001.
Orphans of the Fallout. Darkroom, 2001.
Heavy Metal. Darkroom, 2002.
The End of the Shed. Darkroom, 2001.
Meltdown Heads. together productions, 2004.
Shining Out. Darkroom, 2006.
The Leap. Darkroom, 2010.
The Drift. NCME, 2011.
T'Ales. Carlsberg/DRP, 2011.
Born in Bradford. Incline, 2012.
The Book of damp. Darkroom, 2014.
A box full of cuckoos. Darkroom, 2014.
Born in Bradford. Darkroom, 2014.
Magic Lantern Tales. Darkroom, 2014.
Taraxacum Officinale. Darkroom, 2014.

Solo exhibitions
A touring exhibition across Finland, organised by the National Museum of Labour History, 2003
Life, Salts Mill, Saltaire, Bradford, 2022. A retrospective.

Collections
Science Museum Group, London: 131 prints (as of 17 March 2023)
Smithsonian Institution, Washington, USA: 5 prints (as of 17 March 2023)

Awards
2012: Honorary Fellowship of the Royal Photographic Society, Bath

References

External links

1954 births
Social documentary photographers
20th-century British photographers
21st-century British photographers
Photographers from Yorkshire
People from Bradford